Urocaridella pulchella is a species of shrimp in the family Palaemonidae. Among other places, it is found in the waters near Turkey's coasts.

References

Crustaceans described in 2006
Palaemonidae
Arthropods of Turkey